Eliora Zholkovsky (born ) was an Israeli group rhythmic gymnast. She represents her nation at international competitions.

She participated at the 2012 Summer Olympics in London. She also competed at world championships, including at the 2010 and 2011 World Rhythmic Gymnastics Championships.

References

External links
 
 Introducing Israel's Olympians: R. Gymnastics by The Jerusalem Post
 Rhythmic Gymnastics / A Giant Leap for Israel by Haaretz

1993 births
Living people
Israeli rhythmic gymnasts
Gymnasts at the 2012 Summer Olympics
Olympic gymnasts of Israel
Medalists at the Rhythmic Gymnastics World Championships